Dominique Estrosi Sassone (born 14 November 1958) is a French politician of the Republicans (LR) who has been serving as a member of the French Senate since 2014, representing the department of Alpes-Maritimes.

Early life and education
Estrosi Sassone is the daughter of Jean Sassone, who served as deputy mayor of Nice from 1977 to 1995, and received a master's degree in law from the University of Nice Sophia Antipolis.

Career
Estrosi Sassone served in the territorial civil service before being elected deputy mayor of Nice in 2001. In 2004, she was elected to the regional council for Provence-Alpes-Côte d'Azur. 

Estrosi Sassone was elected to the Senate on 28 September 2014. She also serves as a member of the council for the Metropolis Nice Côte d'Azur. In the Senate, she serves on the Committee on Economic Affairs. In addition to her committee assignments, she has been chairing the French-Monaco Parliamentary Friendship Group since 2020.

In the Republicans' 2016 primary, Estrosi Sassone endorsed Nicolas Sarkozy as the party's candidate for the 2017 French presidential election.

Personal life
Estrosi Sassone was married to fellow LR politician Christian Estrosi; the couple has two daughters but have since divorced.

References 

1958 births
Living people
French Senators of the Fifth Republic
The Republicans (France) politicians
Senators of Alpes-Maritimes
Côte d'Azur University alumni
People from Nice
Politicians from Provence-Alpes-Côte d'Azur
French people of Italian descent